Flexport Inc. is an American multinational corporation that focuses on supply chain management and logistics, including order management, trade financing, insurance, freight forwarding and customs brokerage. The company is headquartered in San Francisco, California, has thousands of employees and has annual revenues of more than $3.3 billion.

Business
Flexport's software integrates and connects ERP data from various companies involved in a supply chain, which allows them to manage information about cargo and streamline freight processing.

It has raised $304M as of 2017, including $110M in its latest Series C round.

In a 2017 interview to Forbes, Flexport's CEO Ryan Petersen said the company started opening their own warehouses for consolidating cargo customer shipments located in Hong Kong and L.A. with plans "to have a global network where we can load and unload cargo".

In 2021, Flexport participated in seed round investment of Pakistan-based trucking startup Bridgelinx. In 2022, Flexport "raised $935 million in a Series E funding round that values the freight forwarding company at $8 billion". It has raised $2.3 billion since its inception. In June 2022, Flexport announced that Amazon worldwide consumer chief Dave Clark would be joining Flexport as its new CEO.

Growth 
In May 2015, the company told Chinese media outlet 36kr.com that they were on pace to generate $60M in sales for 2015. It had more than 600 customers in 2016. It has increased revenue by 25% every month in the 30 months since Flexport was founded, according to Petersen. As of 2017, Flexport has raised $94 million in venture capital from such investors as Peter Thiel’s Founders Fund, First Round Capital and Google Venture. In July 2016, it had 420 employees in seven offices, including Atlanta, Amsterdam, Hong Kong and Shenzhen, and was worth $365 million.

In August 2018 Flexport was named the 8th fastest growing company in USA with a three-year growth of 15,911%.

In 2019, Flexport was named to the 2019 CNBC Disruptor 50, CNBC's annual list of private companies that are transforming the economy, and Inc.'s Best Workplaces.

During the COVID-19 pandemic in 2020, Flexport announced layoffs along with other Silicon Valley tech startups.

In December 2021 Flexport launched the Flexport Certified Partner Network to bring together local expertise and global accessibility.

References

External links
 

Companies based in San Francisco
Logistics companies of the United States
Y Combinator companies
Transportation companies based in California
Customs brokers